Patricio Henriquez is a Quebec based filmmaker.
Henriquez grew up and trained in film-making in Chile, leaving the country after Augusto Pinochet overthrew the democratically elected government of Salvador Allende.

You don't like the truth, a film he co-directed with frequent collaborator Luc Côté
won the best documentary about society award at the first Gémeaux Awards in 2011.

In 1999 the last stand of Salvador Allende won the best history award at the 1999 Hot Docs Film Festival.

Henriquez's film Uyghurs: Prisoners of the Absurd (Ouïghours, prisonniers de l’absurde) had its world premiere on Friday, October 10, 2014, at the Festival du nouveau cinema.  
The film, about the 22 Uyghur captives in Guantanamo, is his third related to controversial US policies on holding civilians,  for years, in extrajudicial detention.  Rushan Abbas, a refugee herself, who had become a US citizen and successful in business, and had agreed to go to Guantanamo to serve as a translator, was one of the experts interviewed in the film told the Montreal Gazette why she agreed to be in Henriquez's film when she had declined other invitations.
{| class="wikitable" 
|
''“When I met Patricio, I saw that not only is he very passionate and a great director, but when I heard about his background, where he came from, I just had an immediate connection with him. He was a refugee himself. He came from another country because he was looking for a better life … a safe life actually. Why am I in America? Why were these people out of China? It just clicked right away. So I wanted to support this all the way.”
|}

References

Living people
Film directors from Montreal
Canadian documentary film directors
Chilean emigrants to Canada
Chilean documentary film directors
Year of birth missing (living people)